or 'giant Buddha' is the Japanese term, often used informally, for large statues of Buddha. The oldest is that at Asuka-dera (609) and the best-known is that at Tōdai-ji in Nara (752). Tōdai-ji's daibutsu is a part of the UNESCO World Heritage Site Historic Monuments of Ancient Nara and National Treasure.

Examples

See also 
 Japanese Buddhism
 Japanese Buddhist architecture
 Japanese sculpture
 List of National Treasures of Japan (sculptures)

References

External links 

 Photographs and information on famous Daibutsu
 New York Public Library Digital Gallery, early photograph of Kamakura Daibutsu from rear
 New York Public Library Digital Gallery, early photograph of Hyōgo Daibutsu

Colossal Buddha statues
Buddhist sculpture
Japanese sculpture
Sculptures in Japan